Astrothelium rimosum is a species of corticolous (bark-dwelling), crustose lichen in the family Trypetheliaceae. Found in Guyana and Colombia, it was formally described as a new species in 2016 by Dutch lichenologist André Aptroot. The lichen has an olive-green to yellowish-green thallus with a thick, hyaline cortex (but lacking a prothallus), and a yellow medulla. Its thallus and medulla contain an anthraquinone that results in a K+ (red) chemical spot test. The combination of characteristics of the lichen that distinguish it from others in Astrothelium are the external and internal yellow pigment of its ascomata, and the form and dimensions of its ascospores (110–150 μm long by 30–37 μm broad with between 7 and 11 septa).

References

rimosum
Lichen species
Lichens described in 2016
Lichens of Guyana
Lichens of Colombia
Taxa named by André Aptroot